Take It or Leave It may refer to:

Music 
 "Take It or Leave It" (Cage the Elephant song)
"Take It or Leave It" (Rolling Stones song)
 "Take It or Leave It", a song by Foghat from Fool for the City
 "Take It or Leave It", a song by Jet from Rare Tracks
 "Take It or Leave It", a song by Madness from Absolutely
 "Take It or Leave It", a song by Ted Nugent from State of Shock
 "Take It or Leave It", a song by The Runaways from Queens of Noise
 "Take It or Leave It", a song by Saga from Images at Twilight
 "Take It or Leave It", a song by Rae Sremmurd from SremmLife 2
 "Take It or Leave It", a song by The Strokes from Is This It
 "Take It or Leave It", a song by Sublime with Rome from Yours Truly
 Take It or Leave It, an album by Vengeance
 Take It or Leave It, an album by Bart Willoughby

Other media 
 Take It or Leave It (1944 film), a film directed by Benjamin Stoloff
 Take It or Leave It (1981 film), a 1981 documentary film about the band Madness
 Take It or Leave It (2018 film), a 2018 Estonian film
 Take It or Leave It (game show), a 2006–2008 UK game show
 Take It or Leave It (radio show), a 1940s CBS radio game show that evolved into The $64 Question

See also 
 "Take or Leave It" (Tom Robinson song), a 1980 song by the band Sector 27 on the album Sector 27; sometimes seen as "Take It or Leave It"
Hobson's choice, a free choice between one option or nothing